Perimede erransella is a moth in the family Cosmopterigidae. It was described by Vactor Tousey Chambers in 1874. It is found in North America, where it has been recorded from Nova Scotia and southern Quebec to Florida, Kentucky and Louisiana.

The wingspan is about 12 mm. Adults have been recorded on wing year round.

The larvae feed on Liriodendron tulipifera, Carya tomentosa, Quercus velutina, Quercus coccinea, Toxodium distichum and Ulmus species.

References

Arctiidae genus list at Butterflies and Moths of the World of the Natural History Museum

Moths described in 1874
Chrysopeleiinae